Uncomfortable is the second studio album by Andy Mineo. The album was released on September 18, 2015, by Reach Records.

Critical reception

Awarding the album four stars from Jesus Freak Hideout, Kevin Hoskins states, "Uncomfortable is a good release and Mineo hits home on some serious thoughts for rap fans to consider." Mark Ryan, giving the album five stars at New Release Today, writes, "It is masterfully thought out, and the entire album moves through a progression of many levels of discomfort for the listener." Rating the album three and a half X's for HipHopDX, Franklin Benjamin says, "It is easy to predict how Uncomfortable will be received: powerful and uplifting if you’re into Christian Rap and love Jesus, a well-produced album if you’re not and don’t, and corny if you think waiting to have sex before marriage is the worst invention of all time."

Calvin Moore, indicating in a two and a half star review by The Christian Manifesto, wrote, "Ultimately, Uncomfortable is a disappointment." Signaling in an eight and a half out of ten review at Christ Core, Bryce Cooley recognizes, "Uncomfortable brings a timelessness that will endure". Chris Major, specifying in a four star review by The Christian Beat, replies, "With a mix of thought-provoking lyrics combined with encouragement and a range of beats, Uncomfortable is an ambitious and bold entry into Christian rap and hip hop that convicts, inspires, and encourages."

Commercial performance
The album debuted at number 10 on the Billboard 200 with 35,000 copies sold in its first week.

Track listing

Additional credits 
 "Uncomfortable" contains background vocals performed by Mali Music
 "Uptown" contains uncredited vocals performed by Willow Stephens & Flaco Navaja
 "Now I Know" contains uncredited vocals performed by Dustin "DAB" Bowie & Mr. Talkbox
 "Desperados" contains background vocals performed by BrvndonP & Dre "The Giant" Garcia
 "Hear My Heart" contains uncredited vocals performed by Crystal Nicole
 "David's Roof" contains background vocals performed by Flaco Navaja
 "Know That's Right" contains uncredited vocals performed by Eris Ford
 "Ghost" contains uncredited vocals performed by Xavier Omär
 "Love" contains uncredited vocals performed by Leah Smith
 "Make Me A Believer" contains background vocals performed by Christon Gray & Kelly Shahbazian

Chart performance

References

2015 albums
Reach Records albums
Andy Mineo albums
Albums produced by Gawvi
Albums produced by Andy Mineo